Polyergus nigerrimus is a species of slave-making ant in the subfamily Formicinae. It is native to Russia.

References

External links

Formicinae
Slave-making ants
Hymenoptera of Asia
Insects of Russia
Insects described in 1963
Taxonomy articles created by Polbot